Thirumalayampalayam is a panchayat town in Coimbatore district in the Indian state of Tamil Nadu. It is an important suburb of Coimbatore.

Demographics
 India census, Thirumalayampalayam had a population of 11,567. Males constitute 50% of the population and females 50%. Thirumalayampalayam has an average literacy rate of 53%, lower than the national average of 59.5%: male literacy is 60%, and female literacy is 46%. In Thirumalayampalayam, 10% of the population is under 6 years of age.

See also
Theppakulathuparai

References

Cities and towns in Coimbatore district
Suburbs of Coimbatore